Jennifer Aylmer (born 1972) is an American operatic soprano noted for significant performances with the Metropolitan Opera, New York City Opera, and as an oratorio soloist with major ensembles such as the National Symphony, and the Oratorio Society of New York.

Highlights of her varied career include performance of Julie Taymor's production of Die Zauberflöte (with baritone Nathan Gunn), and numerous contemporary operatic roles, such as the premiere of the role of Amy in Mark Adamo's Little Women (with Joyce DiDonato and Daniel Belcher) at the Houston Grand Opera, premiere of Bella in Tobias Picker's An American Tragedy (with Nathan Gunn and Patricia Racette), and performance of Stella in André Previn's A Streetcar Named Desire at the Austin Lyric Opera. She has received critical praise from major newspapers including the New York Times, hailing her "awesome accuracy," and the Chicago Sun Times, describing her as "dazzling," "regal," and "fatally attractive."

Alymer graduated from the Eastman School of Music, the Juilliard Opera Center, and received her Masters in Vocal Pedagogy from Westminster Choir College. In 1993, she studied at the Music Academy of the West. She currently serves as a member of the voice faculty at Carnegie Mellon University

References

1972 births
Living people
American operatic sopranos
Westminster Choir College alumni
Eastman School of Music alumni
Juilliard School alumni
21st-century American women opera singers
20th-century American women opera singers
Music Academy of the West alumni